The 2021 UTSA Roadrunners football team represented the University of Texas at San Antonio during the 2021 NCAA Division I FBS football season. The Roadrunners played their home games at the Alamodome in San Antonio, Texas, and competed in the West Division of Conference USA (C-USA). The team was coached by second-year head coach Jeff Traylor.

After a win against Memphis on September 25, UTSA became 4–0 for the first time since the 2012 season. Two weeks later, on October 9, the program became 6–0 for the first time in its history after defeating Western Kentucky. A week later, on the weekend of October 16, the program entered the national polls for the first time, reaching No. 24 in the AP poll and No. 25 in the Coaches poll. The Roadrunners remained undefeated for the first time in its history until their 23–45 loss in the final game of the regular season against North Texas Mean Green football team. A 34–31 victory over UAB clinched the Conference USA Western Division title, their first in program history. The win also confirmed that the Roadrunners would play in their first conference championship game in program history, which they won 49–41 over WKU on December 3.

Previous season

The Roadrunners finished the 2020 regular season 7–5 and 5–2 in C–USA play to finish in second in the West Division. They were invited to play in the First Responder Bowl, which they lost to Louisiana.

Preseason

C-USA media days
The Roadrunners were predicted to finish in second place in the West Division in the Conference USA preseason poll.

Schedule and results
UTSA announced its 2021 football schedule on January 27, 2021. The 2021 schedule consisted of 6 home and 6 away games in the regular season.

Schedule Source:

Personnel

Coaching staff

Roster

Game summaries

at Illinois

Lamar

Middle Tennessee

at Memphis

The Tigers scored 21 unanswered points in the 1st quarter, the first time all season that the Roadrunners trailed in a game. UTSA scored 17 unanswered points in the 4th quarter for the win. Hunter Duplessis nailed a 42-yard field goal as time expired to give the Roadrunners the win.

UNLV

at Western Kentucky

Quarterback Frank Harris threw for six touchdowns, a school record, and caught a 23-yard pass for a touchdown.

Rice

at Louisiana Tech

at UTEP

Southern Miss

UAB

at North Texas

Western Kentucky (C-USA Championship Game)

vs. No. 24 San Diego State (Frisco Bowl)

Rankings 

The Roadrunners received votes from both national polls after a win against Memphis. It marked the second time in program history, being recognized in the AP Poll.

References

UTSA
UTSA Roadrunners football seasons
Conference USA football champion seasons
UTSA Roadrunners football